Tabula is an online multimedia platform in Tbilisi, Georgia.

Content
Tabula covers number of topics including local politics, business and society issues. 

The official website provides daily blogs and news updates covering various topics.

External links 
Tabula Official Webpage

Mass media in Tbilisi
Monthly magazines
Political magazines
Georgian-language websites
Mass media companies of Georgia (country)
Magazines established in 2010
2010 establishments in Georgia (country)
Companies based in Tbilisi